was a railway station on the Towada Kankō Electric Railway Line located in the town of Rokunohe, Aomori Prefecture, Japan. It was 2.7 rail kilometers from the terminus of the Towada Kankō Electric Railway Line at Misawa Station.

History
Ōmagari Station was opened on April 1, 1935 as a signal stop. It was elevated to a full station on May 24, 1938. The station had been unattended since February 21, 1953.

The station was closed when the Towada Kankō Electric Railway Line was discontinued on April 1, 2012.

Lines
Towada Kankō Electric Railway
Towada Kankō Electric Railway Line

Station layout
Ōmagari Station had a single side platform serving bidirectional traffic. There was a small weather shelter on the platform, but no station building. The station was surrounded by farms, with no houses or shops in the vicinity.

Platforms

Adjacent stations

See also
 List of Railway Stations in Japan

References

External links
Totetsu home page 
location map

Railway stations in Japan opened in 1938
Railway stations in Aomori Prefecture
Defunct railway stations in Japan
Railway stations closed in 2012